"Monsters" is a song by English singer-songwriter James Blunt. It was written by Blunt, Amy Wadge and Jimmy Hogarth for Blunt's sixth studio album Once Upon a Mind (2019).  It was released as the fourth single from the album on 1 November 2019.

Blunt has decided to donate all of the profit made from the song to Help for Heroes and British Legion charities.

Background 
James Blunt's father Charles, himself a kidney donor, was diagnosed with stage four chronic kidney disease. Blunt wrote "Monsters" to "express his feelings about his father and his illness, almost as if it's a touching farewell to his father". In an interview with Good Morning Britain Blunt said,

In the same interview he made a plea for type O kidney donors to step forward. In January 2020 MSN reported Blunt's father had been scheduled for a transplant.

Music video 
The music video was filmed in Oxfordshire, UK, and it was directed by Vaughan Arnell. The music video features James Blunt, and his father Charles Blount. The video focuses on a close up of James Blunt's face as he sings the first two verses and choruses of the song, and then switches to a wider angle showing himself and his father sitting at a table while he sings the final part.

Australian television presenter Lisa Wilkinson said she was "left bawling" after watching the music video of the song. Monika Barton of Newshub wrote about the music video, "Go on, have a little watch and see if you have a heart, or merely just a sharp, pointy piece of flint where it should be".

Reception 

Minnie Wright of the Daily Express wrote, "Heartbreaking perspective illuminates the place from which Blunt has penned the deeply personal Once Upon A Mind with the arrival of Monster". Lauren Murphy of Entertainment.ie wrote, "Before you watch this video, be warned that it's pretty tough going if you're feeling in any way emotionally fragile, or have lost a parent". Rudi Kinsella of Joe wrote, "This is one of the most emotional music videos we've seen in a very long time".

Charts

References

External links 
 Lyrics of this song at Genius

2019 songs
Charity singles
Songs written by James Blunt
James Blunt songs
Songs written by Jim Irvin
Songs written by Jimmy Hogarth